Puerto Indio is a town in the Emberá indigenous territory of Panama. The town is on the Sabalo river, just upstream of the town of Sambú.

Sources 

World Gazetteer: Panama – World-Gazetteer.com

Populated places in Comarca Emberá-Wounaan